The 1922 Latvian Football Championship was contested by 6 teams with Kaiserwald emerging as the winners of the championship.

League standings

References
 RSSSF

1922
Lat
Lat
Football Championship